Pool Rock Plantation is a historic plantation house located near Williamsboro, Vance County, North Carolina.  It consists of two, two-story sections.  The older was built in 1757 by James Mitchell, an immigrant from Lunenburg County, Virginia. His daughter, Amy Mitchell, married Michael Satterwhite in the house in 1759.  It is a two-story, three bay, Federal style frame structure.  It forms the rear section.  About 1855, a more ornate two-story, three bay, Italianate style frame structure attributed to Jacob W. Holt (1811-1880).  The later section has a shallow hipped roof and overhanging eaves.  The two sections are joined by a two-story hallway linker.  Also on the property is a contributing one-story, hip roof office building.

It was listed on the National Register of Historic Places in 1971.

References

Plantation houses in North Carolina
Houses on the National Register of Historic Places in North Carolina
Federal architecture in North Carolina
Italianate architecture in North Carolina
Houses completed in 1827
Houses in Vance County, North Carolina
National Register of Historic Places in Vance County, North Carolina
1827 establishments in North Carolina